Strawberry mottle virus (SMV) is a pathogenic plant virus in Secoviridae, a family of plant-infecting picornaviruses. It is not yet assigned to a genus. Virions are isometric, approximately 28 nm in diameter, and contain two RNA strands (RNA1 and RNA2) equal to about 12,600 nucleotides in length. The polyprotein of RNA1 contains regions identified as helicase, protease, RNA-dependent RNA polymerase and a viral genome-linked protein while RNA2 shows similarities to the large coat protein domain of the Satsuma dwarf virus.

References

External links 
 ICTVdB - The Universal Virus Database: Strawberry mottle virus (SMV)
 Family Groups - The Baltimore Method
 ICTV Virus Taxonomy 2009 
 UniProt Taxonomy 

Secoviridae
Viral strawberry diseases